A constitutional referendum was held in Liechtenstein on 29 January 2023. Voters voted on a proposal to ban casinos, with 73% voting against the proposal. If a ban had been approved, casinos in Liechtenstein would have been closed and banned by 2028.

Background 
Gambling was prohibited in Liechtenstein until 2010, when it was legalised. There are currently six casinos in the country, which doubled from three in 2019. The national casino association has conceded that it "sees no economic basis for so many casinos in the future". The industry generated CHF 28 million in gambling levies in 2022, which amounted to 3% of tax revenue in the year.

Petition
The group IG VolksMeinung collected more than 2,000 signatures in favour of a ban, from the population of 38,000. The Landtag of Liechtenstein voted against the ban, so it therefore had to be decided by referendum.

Results

References

Referendums in Liechtenstein
Liechtenstein
Constitutional
Gambling referendums